"Can't Hurt Me Now" is a song written by Fredrik Thomander and Aleena Gibson and performed by Jessica Andersson at Melodifestivalen 2015, where the song ended up 11th in the final.

Chart positions

References 

2015 singles
2015 songs
Jessica Andersson songs
Melodifestivalen songs of 2015
Songs written by Aleena Gibson
Songs written by Fredrik Thomander